The diplomatic relations between Albania and Ukraine were established in 1922. 
In September 2020, Ukraine opened an embassy in Tirana. Albania is accredited to Ukraine from its embassy in Warsaw, Poland and has an honorary consulate in Kharkiv.

Albania opposed the 2014 annexation of Crimea by Russia and its moves to destabilise eastern areas of Ukraine. Albanian authorities stated the West needed to respond in a firm and unitary manner toward Russian actions in Ukraine.

As Russian military actions in Ukraine commenced, Albanian President Ilir Meta, Prime Minister Edi Rama, Minister for Europe and Foreign Affairs Olta Xhaçka, and Ambassador to the UN Ferit Hoxha made statements condemning the Russian invasion of Ukraine. After a NATO summit, Rama said that Albania would be ready to welcome a few thousand Ukrainian refugees fleeing the war. Albania opposed Russia's recognition of the separatist regions in Ukraine's Donbass as independent and considered it a violation of international law, the Minsk Protocol and Ukrainian sovereignty.

In late February 2022, Albania and the US tabled a co-written resolution condemning the Russian invasion of Ukraine at the 15 member UN Security Council, but failed to pass as Russia vetoed it. At the UN Security Council, Albania cosponsored a resolution with the US for an emergency General Assembly session to be held regarding the invasion of Ukraine. As it was a procedural vote, Russia's opposition did not affect the outcome and the resolution passed. In a phone call with Prime minister Rama, Ukrainian President Volodymyr Zelenskyy thanked Albania's efforts and assistance to Ukraine.

The name of a Tirana street where the Ukrainian embassy is located was changed to "Free Ukraine" by Mayor Erion Veliaj. In early March, Albania's honorary consulate in Kharkiv was shelled and destroyed by Russian forces, there were no casualties as its staff had evacuated the building. A resolution was passed by the Albanian parliament supporting Ukraine and its borders. Albania delivered military equipment to Ukraine for its combat operations opposing Russia. In mid-March, Albania received 351 Ukrainian refugees with the government offering to house several thousand other Ukrainians. Albania has allowed any Ukrainians entering the country to remain without visas and a resident's permit for up to a year.

Diplomatic offices 
Diplomatic and consular missions of Ukraine: The Embassy of Ukraine in Albania has been operating since September 1, 2020.

Diplomatic and consular missions of Albania: The Embassy of Albania in Ukraine (part-time) with a residence in Warsaw, Poland. In early 2023, Albanian Foreign Minister Olha Jachka announced that Albania plans to open its embassy in Ukraine.

See also
 Foreign relations of Albania
 Foreign relations of Ukraine
 Albanians in Ukraine
 Ukrainians in Albania

References

 
Ukraine
Bilateral relations of Ukraine